The 2018 Simona Halep tennis season officially began on 1 January 2018 with the start of the 2018 WTA Tour. Simona Halep entered the season as the No. 1 ranked player in the world.

Year in detail

Early hard court season and Australian Open

Shenzhen Open
Halep began her season at the Shenzhen Open. She was the top seed and advanced to the final after successfully defeating Nicole Gibbs, Duan Yingying, Aryna Sabalenka and Irina-Camelia Begu. She defeated her in the opponent's final that eliminated her one year ago in R16 in three sets, Kateřina Siniaková.

Australian Open
Her next tournament was the Australian Open. She was the main draw favorite for the first time in a Grand Slam career. She defeated Destanee Aiava in straight sets, still in the first round injured at the right leg's ankle. She then beat Eugenie Bouchard, former world rank 5, Lauren Davis in an epic match that lasted 3 hours and 45 minutes  taking the third set 15–13. The match equaled the Australian Open record for most games played in a women's singles draw match at 48 — equaling Chanda Rubin's 1996 quarterfinal win over Arantxa Sánchez Vicario. She went on to defeat Naomi Osaka in the 4th round in straight sets and former world No. 1 Karolina Pliskova in the quarter-finals, also in straight sets. She faced former world No. 1 and 2016 Australian Open champion Angelique Kerber in the semi-finals. In the 3rd set, she saved two match points and went on to win, qualifying for the Australian Open final for the first time.

In the final, Halep was defeated by Caroline Wozniacki in three sets.

After Australian Open fell to second place for four weeks.

Qatar Ladies Open
Halep then played the Qatar Open, where she received a bye in the first round. She defeated Ekaterina Makarova with a bagel in the second set. The Australian Open finalist put together a dominant performance and needed just 58 minutes. She then defeated Anastasija Sevastova, seed 13 in straight sets. Her next opponent was American, CiCi Bellis. The first set was won by a bagel. In semifinal should have played with, but withdrawing prior to her match against Garbine Muguruza because of a right foot injury. Nevertheless, despite not playing the next week, she returned to the top spot.

March sunshine events

Indian Wells Masters
Halep then played the Indian Wells Masters, where she received a bye in the first round. She defeated Kristýna Plíšková in straight sets, Caroline Dolehide in three sets, Wang Qiang in straight sets and Petra Martić in three sets, in straight sets before she lost to Naomi Osaka again in the semifinal.

Miami Open
Halep then entered the Miami Open, where she also received a bye in the first round. In round 2 beat French Océane Dodin in three sets. However, she lost in the third round to 2012 champion Agnieszka Radwanska.

European clay court season

Fed Cup, World Group-Play Off
She kicked off her clay court campaign by leading Romania against Switzerland in their World Group Play-off tie in Cluj-Napoca. By virtue of a 3-1 victory with Halep going 2-0 in the singles rubbers, they secured a place in the 2019 World Group for the first time in two years.

Porsche Tennis Grand Prix
After Fed Cup, Halep went to Stuttgart where she knocked a victory on Magdaléna Rybáriková before losing to quarters at CoCo Vandeweghe

Mutua Madrid Open
Halep then played the Madrid Open. She defeated Ekaterina Makarova, giving up just one game, Elise Mertens with a bagel in first set, Kristýna Plíšková and advanced into the quarterfinals. However, she lost Karolína Plíšková in straight sets, after winning the last two editions and after having only 15 victories in a row.

Italian Open
Halep's next tournament was the Italian Open, where she received a bye in the first round. She defeated Naomi Osaka, winner at Indian Wells, yielding a single game. In the third round should have played with Madison Keys, but the latter had to retire due to a shoulder injury, so Simona qualified in the quarter-finals without playing in round 3. In the quarter-finals defeated Caroline Garcia, the 7th World Player, with only 5 games. In semifinal has marred one of her rivals Russian, Maria Sharapova winning editions of 2011, 2012 and 2015 in an epic match. Simona won in 3 sets after losing the first set. In the final she lost to the same opponent last year, Elina Svitolina. She lost the first set to 0.

French Open
In the French Open, Halep was the 1st seed for the second time in a Grand Slam. In the first round, she defeated Alison Riske losing the first set. She was forced to compete on the 4th day on Wednesday after the match was postponed due to the dark. In the second round, she easily defeated the American wildcard Taylor Townsend. Her opponent in the third round was the 2014 semi-finalist, Andrea Petkovic. Halep defeated the German in straight sets, not losing a game in the second set. Her next opponent was the 16th seed Elise Mertens, who she defeated in 59 minutes, dropping just 3 games. In the quarterfinals, she met Kerber in a rematch of the Australian Open semifinal, and defeated her once again in three sets.. In the semi-final she met former world No. 1 and French Open champion Garbiñe Muguruza, and defeated her in straight sets. In the final, Halep met Sloane Stephens, and came back from a set deficit to win her first Grand Slam title, on her fourth attempt. She became the first Romanian woman to win a Grand Slam title since Virginia Ruzici won the French Open in 1978.

All matches

Singles matches

Tournament schedule

Singles schedule
Halep's 2018 singles tournament schedule is as follows:

Yearly records

Head-to-head matchups

Players are ordered by letter.
(Bold denotes a top 10 player at the time of the most recent match between the two players, Italic denotes top 50.)

Top 10 wins

Finals
Singles: 6 (3 titles, 3 runner-ups)

Earnings
The tournaments won by Halep are in boldface.

See also

 2018 WTA Tour
 2018 Angelique Kerber tennis season
 2018 Caroline Wozniacki tennis season
 Simona Halep career statistics
 List of WTA number 1 ranked tennis players

Notes

References

External links

 
 
 
 

Simona Halep tennis seasons
Halep tennis season
2018 in Romanian sport